Jorge González (born 2 May 1957) is a Spanish former sport shooter who competed in the 1984 Summer Olympics, in the 1988 Summer Olympics, in the 1992 Summer Olympics, in the 1996 Summer Olympics, and in the 2000 Summer Olympics.

References

1957 births
Living people
Spanish male sport shooters
ISSF rifle shooters
Olympic shooters of Spain
Shooters at the 1984 Summer Olympics
Shooters at the 1988 Summer Olympics
Shooters at the 1992 Summer Olympics
Shooters at the 1996 Summer Olympics
Shooters at the 2000 Summer Olympics
20th-century Spanish people